Puerto Rican rapper Bad Bunny has released five studio albums, one mixtape, one extended play, one compilation album, sixty-nine singles as a lead artist and thirty-two singles as a featured artist.

His first studio album X 100pre was released on Christmas Eve, 2018. It debuted at number eleven on the  Billboard 200 chart and at number one on the Top Latin Albums chart and received a Latin diamond certification by the Recording Industry Association of America (RIAA) for selling over 600,000 copies in the United States.

For his second studio album, he joined J Balvin and released their collaborative album, Oasis, on June 28, 2019. The album topped the Top Latin Albums chart, debuted in the top ten of the Billboard 200 charts, and was certified 2 × Platinum by the RIAA.

As of June 2022, the musician has had sixty-five songs enter the  Billboard Hot 100, including the number-one hit "I Like It" (with Cardi B and J Balvin), and the top-five singles "Mia" (featuring Drake) and "Dakiti" (featuring Jhay Cortez). Moreover, Bad Bunny has collaborated with multiple artists, including Ricky Martin, Jennifer Lopez, Maluma, Daddy Yankee, Anuel AA, Enrique Iglesias, Becky G, Karol G, Farruko, Ozuna, Prince Royce, and Marc Anthony.

Albums

Studio albums

Collaborative albums

Compilation albums

Box sets

EPs

Singles

As lead artist

As featured artist

Promotional singles

Other charted and certified songs

Notes

References 

Discographies of Puerto Rican artists
Hip hop discographies
Reggaeton discographies